Citrus depressa (Citrus × depressa, formerly C. pectinifera,  or , , in English sometimes called shiikuwasha, shequasar, Taiwan tangerine, Okinawa lime, flat lemon, hirami lemon, or thin-skinned flat lemon, is a small, green citrus fruit rich in flavonoids and native to East Asia (Taiwan Island and Okinawa Islands, Japan).

Very sour, it is often used like lemon or lime to garnish dishes, but is also used to make jams, or a yellow juice, which can be thinned or sweetened.

Its name is occasionally translated into English as calamansî (calamondin), but strictly speaking, this is a different fruit.

Shiikuwasha is primarily produced in southwest Japan, in the northern region of the main Okinawa island, along with another indigenous Japanese citrus, Tachibana (Citrus tachibana). The two are not the only species of citrus currently growing on the island, as there have been foreign species introduced and have since been crossbred alongside Citrus depressa. Despite the varying diversity of citrus currently found in the region, only Shiikuwasha and Tachibana are native to this region, originating in the Ryukyu Islands.

Description

Citrus depressa is grown in Okinawa and Taiwan. Shikuwasa is grown in Okinawa. The appearance is similar to calamansi. Unripe, the skin is a dark green, which becomes yellow during ripening. The fruits have a very low sugar content and are very sour in September, but gradually become sweeter as they ripen.

Genetics
Genetic analysis of shiikuwasha and other Asian island mandarin orange varieties revealed this group to be a family of independent clonal F1 hybrids, arising from multiple crosses between a native Ryukyu Islands mandarin species, C. ryukyuensis, and a mainland-Asian mandarin C. reticulata still found on Okinawa, designated RK3 by the researchers. This mainland parent is related to the Chinese Sun Chu Sha mandarin but has small amounts of pomello introgression that was passed on to the shiikuwasha. The mainland parent reproduces clonally, as do the shiikuwasha progeny of numerous independent hybridization events with distinct individual sexually-reproducing Ryukyu mandarin parents, sometimes serving as seed parent and sometimes as pollen parent. This varied origin, plus the fact that shiikuwasha grow wild and are referred to in some of the earliest poetry of the island kingdoms, suggest that the hybridizations occurred naturally.

Health benefits 
Shiikuwasha is often used as a fruit juice and has been used for alternative health practices frequently. Though the pulp has some beneficial nutrients, most health-benefitting compounds present in the fruit's peel are:

 Synephrine, a compound known to enhance lipid metabolism and increase metabolic rate.
 Nobiletin (NBL), tangeretin and sinensetin, where nobiletin is predominate. NBL has been linked to anti-carcinogenic and anti-inflammatory biological properties. Similarly, there is a high concentration of anti-tumorous compounds limonin glucoside and nomilin glucoside in the fruits' seed.
 NBL in C. depressa is also linked to hepatoprotective activities in liver-injuries induced by acetaminophen.

Though commonly used as a fruit juice and considered an aid in metabolic health, C. depressa can potentially also aid in fat regulation. The addition of C. depressa alongside a high-fat diet has demonstrated to decrease fat mass, though this is based on a study done on rat models, and little study has been done to determine a similar correlation in humans. Dried shiikuwasha, however, is often mixed with teas for its therapeutic benefits, and can be mixed into a fruit paste with chili pepper as a garnish on grilled meats. Shiikuwasha paste has also been demonstrated to decrease plasma glucose levels in lab rats and human volunteers.

High levels of flavonoids provide the bitter taste often associated with the fruit. To make Shiikuwasha juice more palatable, sugar is commonly added excessively. However, fermentation of Citrus depressa juice has also been demonstrated to cause a significant decrease in the umami, bitterness and astringent tastes of the fruit, to aid in creating a more flavorful drink while maintaining the nutritional content of the fruit.

Shiikuwasha fruits are also a significant source of anti-oxidants.

See also 
Citrus microcarpa (calamansi), a similar cultivar widely used in the Philippines

References

External links

depressa
Citrus hybrids
Fruits originating in East Asia
Japanese fruit
Okinawan cuisine
Taxa named by Bunzō Hayata